Bodil Kjær (born 11 March 1932 in Hatting near Horsens) is a Danish architect, furniture designer, professor and researcher, who has specialized in interior design and city planning. Today she is recognized above all for the flexible series of office furniture she designed in the 1960s.

Early life

The daughter of a Jutland farmer, Kjær studied in Copenhagen at the School for Interior Architecture (1964) and then in London at the Royal College of Art and at the Architectural Association School of Architecture (1965–69).

Interior design

She has worked as a senior architect at the Arup building consultancy in London (1967–69), has been a professor at the University of Maryland (1982–89) and has had studios of her own in Copenhagen (1960–65) and in London (1969–79). Inspired by the Modernist masters Mies van der Rohe and Marcel Breuer, she has always given her work an international appeal. Her interior design work has included the development of furniture, lighting, and glass for a wide range of buildings from housing in the African tropics to factories, offices and universities. She has since conducted research into the future of cities and has worked as a planning and design consultant.

Furniture

Kjær's furniture designs date mainly from 1959 to 1964. Her first assignment was an upholstered series for Paul Rudolph, dean of the Yale School of Architecture, who made the order for his Blue Cross Blue Shield tower in Boston, Massachusetts. She also provided designs for Josep Lluís Sert, dean of the Harvard Graduate School of Design, for a Harvard University building. Marcel Breuer installed 28 of her upholstered sofas in a building he had designed in New York. Examples of her furniture can still be seen today at Harvard University, Massachusetts Institute of Technology and Boston University. In notes she prepared in 1995 for an exhibition in Berlin, Kjær commented: "I often ran into problems of finding furniture that would express the same form-ideas as those we employed in the buildings we designed and which would, at the same time, express the ideas of contemporary management. The office furniture I found on the market in 1959, I found to be clumsy and confining, while neither the new architecture nor the new management thinking was the least bit clumsy or confining."

Her working table (1959) was designed as part of a flexible working environment. The prototype, in ashwood with a matte, chrome plated base, was made for Massachusetts Institute of Technology. A model in walnut was made for Wellesley College. In addition to the table with its four inset drawers, Kjær designed a number of storage items with adjustable shelves and drawers which could be placed under the table or beside a wall.

The table has been used widely in films (From Russia with Love) and on television (BBC election broadcasts) as well as by celebrities including Prince Philip (at Sandringham), the actor Michael Caine, and the pianist Oscar Peterson. In the 1960s, the table and storage elements were manufactured by E. Pedersen & Søn in Rødovre, Denmark as well as in Boston. But production terminated in 1974 when one manufacturer went bankrupt and another suffered fire damage. Some of her office units and upholstered designs were reissued between 2007 and 2009 by Hothouse Design in Shanghai but production has now ceased. Today her furniture is auctioned at increasingly high prices. In 2008, one of her working tables was sold for DKK 131,250 or some $24,000.

The Rights to Bodil Kjær's designs are managed by FORM portfolios.

See also
Danish modern
Danish design

References

Danish furniture designers
Danish architects
Danish interior designers
Danish women designers
People from Horsens Municipality
1932 births
Danish modern
University of Maryland, College Park faculty
Living people
Danish women architects